Arudan or Aroodan may refer to:
 Arudan-e Olya
 Arudan-e Sofla
 Arudan Rural District